Partapur may refer to:
 Partapur, Rajasthan, a town in  Banswara district of Rajasthan
 Partapur, Uttar Pradesh, a town in Meerut district of Uttar Pradesh
 Partapur, Karnataka, a settlement in Bidar district of Karnataka
 Partap Pore, a village in Jammu and Kashmir, India